Walter Bauza (11 October 1939 – 17 January 2015) was an Argentine sports shooter. He competed in the men's 50 metre free pistol event at the 1984 Summer Olympics.

References

1939 births
2015 deaths
Argentine male sport shooters
Olympic shooters of Argentina
Shooters at the 1984 Summer Olympics
Place of birth missing
Pan American Games medalists in shooting
Pan American Games gold medalists for Argentina
Shooters at the 1979 Pan American Games